Micrografx (Micrografx Inc., Richardson, Texas) was a United States-based software-house most notable for its graphics products. It was founded in 1982 by Paul and George Grayson and was a pioneer for graphics products for Windows.

Micrografx acquired Roykore Inc and their ABC Suite, which included ABC Flowcharter and ABC Orgchart of software in 1992. They acquired AdvanEdge Technologies in Tualatin, OR and their process simulation software Optima! in 1997. In 1999 they combined the products and shipped iGrafx v8.

Corel and Micrografx were competitors in 1996 for Windows 95 users seeking graphics software. CorelDraw 6 attracted graphics professionals, while Micrografx ABC Graphics Suite attracted general users in the business community. The company was acquired by Corel in late 2001. With this acquisition, the Micrografx graphics line (e.g. Micrografx Picture Publisher, Micrografx Designer) was integrated into the Corel portfolio. Since 2003, the former Micrografx software section for business process analysis is represented by the separate business unit iGrafx.

Despite not being actively maintained or officially distributed, a scattered community still enjoys Micrografx products as legacy software.

Products range 
 ABC FlowCharter 
 Diagramming software
 ABC Graphics Suite
 A business-oriented graphics software bundle, released in 1995, featuring ABC Flowcharter, Designer and Picture Publisher and ABC Media Manager.

 Optima!
 A process simulation software created by AdvanEdge Technologies, later acquired.
 ABC SnapGraphix
 Crayola Art
 Micrografx Charisma
 A charting application with the ability to combine several charts on one printed page and limited vector graphics capabilities to enrich the results.
 Micrografx Simply 3D
 Micrografx Designer
Released as In*A*Vision graphic software for Windows 1.0 in 1986, this Vector graphics editor was renamed to Micrografx Designer when version 2 was released in 1990.  In 1995, Micrografx bundled its graphic software with the Micrografx ABC-Suite. After the acquisition by Corel in 2001, the product was continued as Corel Designer.
 Micrografx Photo Magic
 a Raster graphics editor 
 Micrografx Webtricity
 Picture Publisher
 Micrografx Windows Draw
 A desktop publishing application that worked well in conjunction with Photo Magic

References 

Software companies based in Texas
Defunct companies based in Texas
Defunct software companies of the United States
Companies based in Richardson, Texas
American companies established in 1982
Software companies established in 1982
Software companies disestablished in 2001
1982 establishments in Texas
2001 disestablishments in Texas
Corel
2001 mergers and acquisitions